Zarkak (also Romanized as Zargak) is a village in Balaband Rural District, in the Central District of Fariman County, Razavi Khorasan Province, Iran. At the 2006 census, its population was 450, in 102 families.

References 

Populated places in Fariman County